Iva angustifolia is a species of flowering plant in the family Asteraceae known by the common name  narrowleaf marsh elder. It grows in the south-central and southeastern United States (Kansas, Oklahoma, Arkansas, Texas, Louisiana, Florida).

Iva angustifolia is a wind-pollinated annual herb sometimes as much as 100 cm (40 inches) tall. It has long, narrow leaves up to 45 mm (1.8 inches) tall. It produces numerous small flower heads in elongated arrays at the tips of branches, each head with 2-7 flowers.

References

External links
photo of herbarium specimen at Missouri Botanical Garden, collected in Missouri in 1917
Lady Bird Johnson Wildflower Center, University of Texas
Dave's Garden
University of Texas photos

angustifolia
Flora of the United States
Plants described in 1836